Baat Cheet ( or  ; English: Tête-à-Tête) is a 2015 Pakistani comedy drama short film by Rayika Choudri. The film stars Sarwat Gilani and Joshinder Chaggar in lead roles.

The film won three Gold awards at the 2015 Documentary and Short International Movie Awards in Indonesia  Baat Cheet is participating in the 2015 Short Film Corner category at the Cannes Film Festival as part of a broad showcase of short films from around the world.

Outline
Anjum and Mehreen are two friends living in Karachi who meet and catch up on recent events in each other's lives. Their conversation winds impressionistically through various accounts, depicting the ways in which people cope with the challenges of ordinary life.

Cast
 Sarwat Gilani as Anjum
 Joshinder Chaggar as Mehreen
 Fahad Mirza as Asim
 Shumaila Masood as Laila
 Hammad Hasan Askri as Teenage Thief
 Wusat Ullah Khan as Interviewer
 Safdar Shah as Blood Bank Security Guard
 Taha Khan as Mugger

Awards

See also
 Cannes Film Festival

References

External links
 Official website
 Baat Cheet  at International Movie Awards Winners 2015 - Indonesia
 

2015 comedy-drama films
2015 films
2010s Urdu-language films
2015 short films
Pakistani short films
Pakistani comedy-drama films
Urdu-language Pakistani films